Chernoochene; is a village in central southern Bulgaria, part of Kardzhali Province. It is the administrative centre of Chernoochene municipality, which comprises in the northernmost part of Kardzhali Province. The village is located in the Eastern Rhodope Mountains and has a predominantly Turkish population. The village's name roughly means "place of the black-eyed people" in Bulgarian and (as Karagözler) in Turkish.

Municipality
Chernoochene municipality covers an area of 339 square kilometres and includes the following 51 places:

External links
 Chernoochene municipality website 

Villages in Kardzhali Province